Emperor He may refer to the following Chinese emperors:

 Emperor He of Han (reign: 88–105)
 Emperor He of Southern Qi (reign: 501–502)